The Eurasian Customs Union (EACU; , Tamozhennyi soiuz) was a customs union consisting of all the member states of the Eurasian Economic Union. The customs union was a principal task of the Eurasian Economic Community, established in 2000, and succeeded by the Eurasian Economic Union. No customs were levied on goods travelling within the customs union and – unlike a free-trade area – members of the customs union imposed a common external tariff on all goods entering the union. The Eurasian Union negotiated as a single entity in international trade deals, such as the World Trade Organisation, instead of individual member states negotiating for themselves.

It came into existence on 1 January 2010. Its founding states were Belarus, Kazakhstan, and Russia. On 2 January 2015 it was enlarged to include Armenia. Kyrgyzstan acceded to the EEU on 6 August 2015. The original treaty establishing the Customs Union was terminated by the agreement establishing the Eurasian Economic Union, signed in 2014, which incorporated the Customs Union into the EEU's legal framework.

The member states continued with economic integration and removed all customs borders between each other after July 2011. On 19 November 2011, the member states put together a joint commission on fostering closer economic ties, planning to create a Eurasian Economic Union by 2015. On 1 January 2012, the three states formed a single economic space to promote further economic integration. The Eurasian Economic Commission is the regulatory agency for the Customs Union and the Eurasian Economic Community.

The creation of the Eurasian Customs Union was guaranteed by 3 different treaties signed in 1995, 1999 and 2007. The first treaty in 1995 guaranteeing its creation, the second in 1999 guaranteeing its formation, and the third in 2007 announced the establishment of a common customs territory and the formation of the customs union.

Overview 

Export
 When exporting goods a zero rated VAT is guaranteed and (or) the exemption (refunds) of excise taxes if sufficient documentary evidence has been provided (proof of export).
Imports
 Imported goods into the territory of Russia from the territory of Belarus or Kazakhstan are subject to VAT and excise duties and are levied by the Russian tax authorities.
As of 2013, 87.95% of customs import duties come from Russia's budget, 4.7% from Belarus and the remainder from Kazakhstan.

Market access to Eurasian Economic Union (EAEU) – CU EAC approval

Access of products to the single territory of the Eurasian Economic Union – EAEU (Belarus, Russia, Kazakhstan, Armenia, Kyrgyzstan) (formerly Customs Union) is granted after products have proved to be compliant with the requirements of Customs Union (CU) technical regulations (TRs) which are applicable to the product. As of September 2016, 36 CU TRs have been developed covering different types of products. Some TRs are still being developed. Here you can see the list of developed CU TRs. 

There are two types of conformity assessment procedures – certification of conformity (CoC) and declaration of conformity (DoC). List of products which are subject to certification and declaration is provided in the relevant CU TRs. The customer can always choose to order a CU Certificate instead of a CU Declaration.

For DoC, the applicant must be a local entity registered in the territory of an EAEU member country. The range of applicants for Certification is defined in the relevant CU TRs (e.g. for CU TR 004/2011 Safety of low voltage equipment and CU TR 020/2011 Electromagnetic Compatibility (EMC), the applicant can be ).

All conformity assessment works (testing/inspection/certification) can only be done by local certification bodies/testing laboratories accredited in the EAEU member countries by their national accrediting authorities. However where the EAEU countries are members of international organizations (such as IECEE), competent national certification bodies in EAEU accredited in the same international organizations (e.g. for the IECEE, the list of EAEU certification bodies accredited in IECEE can be seen at the following link) have the legal right to recognize the results of the national certification bodies from the other member countries of these international organizations.

For products which successfully passed the CU EAC conformity assessment procedure – a CU EAC certificate is issued (an example CU EAC certificate). All certificates/declarations are officially registered (by the certification bodies) in the Registers for CU EAC certificates/declarations  maintained by each member country. The term of validity is defined in the certificate (it can be up to 5 years). For series manufacturing certificates, there's mandatory annual surveillance procedure (performed via sample test or factory inspection).

Products complying with all applicable CU TRs are marked with the mandatory EAC mark.

The EAEU member countries managed to agree on unification of requirements for most of categories of products/services (via CU TRs). However:

a) There are areas where national requirements are valid in each member country. E.g. for RF (radiotelecommunication) appliances/modules. It is not currently planned to develop unified requirements in the EAEU for this type of products, although this may change in the future. As of today, it is not expected that unified requirements in EAEU for radio-telecom appliances/modules would appear earlier than in 2020.

b) Due to uneasy process of development of CU TR system in EAEU, the national member countries are starting to implement national requirements in the areas strategically important for these countries in the absence of proper quality unified EAEU TRs (e.g. Belarus introduced mandatory national energy efficiency requirements for electrical products on its territory from 01.02.2017 ).

Before TRs came into force, the following approvals were the basis for access to the Eurasian Economic Union (Customs Union) member countries:
National approvals/certificates – they were good for access of product to the country where this approval/certificate has been issued.
Customs Union certificates/approvals issued in accordance with the "List of products subject to mandatory conformity approval in the Customs Union" – such certificate/approval was valid in all the three member countries of the Customs Union.

The Customs Union has meant that a transit visa is needed when travelling to or from Armenia, Belarus, Kazakhstan or Kyrgyzstan, and changing plane in Russia.

See also
Commonwealth of Independent States
Union State
Eurasian Economic Community
Collective Security Treaty Organization
Shanghai Cooperation Organisation
Eurasian Economic Union
Eurasian Development Bank
Enlargement of the Eurasian Economic Union
Soviet Union
European Union
Free trade areas in Europe
European Union Customs Union
Post-Soviet states
Trade bloc
Schengen Area

Notes

References

External links
 

2010 in economics
Commonwealth of Independent States
Eurasia
Eurasian Economic Union
International trade organizations
Multilateral relations of Russia
Organizations established in 2010
Post-Soviet alliances
Customs unions